Sarcophyton is the scientific name of several genera of organisms and may refer to:

 Sarcophyton (plant), a genus of plants in the family Orchidaceae
 Sarcophyton (coral), a genus of corals in the family Alcyoniidae